Palingenesis (also palingenesia) is a concept of rebirth or re-creation, used in various contexts in philosophy, theology, politics, and biology.

In biology, it is another word for recapitulationthe largely discredited hypothesis which talks of the phase in the development of an organism in which its form and structure pass through the changes undergone in the evolution of the species. In political theory, it is a central component of Roger Griffin's analysis of fascism as a fundamentally modernist ideology. In theology, the word may refer to reincarnation or to Christian spiritual rebirth.

Philosophy and theology

The word palingenesis or rather palingenesia may be traced back to the Stoics, who used the term for the continual re-creation of the universe. Similarly Philo spoke of Noah and his sons as leaders of a renovation or rebirth of the earth, Plutarch of the transmigration of souls, and Cicero of his own return from exile.

In the Gospel of Matthew Jesus Christ is quoted in Greek (although his historical words most probably would have been Aramaic) using the word "παλιγγενεσία" (palingenesia) to describe the Last Judgment foreshadowing the event of the regeneration of a new world.

In philosophy it denotes in its broadest sense the theory (e.g. of the Pythagoreans) that the human soul does not die with the body but is born again in new incarnations. It is thus the equivalent of metempsychosis. The term has a narrower and more specific use in the system of Arthur Schopenhauer, who applied it to his doctrine that the will does not die but manifests itself afresh in new individuals. He thus modified the original metempsychosis doctrine which maintains the reincarnation of the particular soul.

Robert Burton, in The Anatomy of Melancholy (1628), writes, "The Pythagoreans defend metempsychosis and palingenesia, that souls go from one body to another."

Politics and history
In Antiquities of the Jews (11.3.9) Josephus used the term palingenesis for the national restoration of the Jews in their homeland after the Babylonian exile. The term is commonly used in Modern Greek to refer to the rebirth of the Greek nation after the Greek Revolution. Thomas Carlyle used it in Sartor Resartus (1833–34), referring to the "Newbirth of Society", a stage in Carlyle's cyclical view of history as the "burning of a World-Phoenix".

British political theorist Roger Griffin has coined the term palingenetic ultranationalism as a core tenet of fascism, stressing the notion of fascism as an ideology of rebirth of a state or empire in the image of that which came before it – its ancestral political underpinnings. Examples of this are Fascist Italy and Nazi Germany. Under Benito Mussolini, Italy purported to establish an empire as the second incarnation of the Roman Empire, while Adolf Hitler's regime purported itself to be the third palingenetic incarnation of the German "Reich" – beginning first with the Holy Roman Empire ("First Reich"), followed by Bismarck's German Empire ("Second Reich") and then Nazi Germany ("Third Reich").

Moreover, Griffin's work on palingenesis in fascism analysed the pre-war fin de siècle Western society. In doing so he built on Frank Kermode's work The Sense of an Ending which sought to understand the belief in the death of society at the end of the century.

Chilean dictator Augusto Pinochet expressed his post-coup project in government as a national rebirth inspired in Diego Portales, a figure of the early republic:

Science
In modern biology (e.g., Ernst Haeckel and Fritz Müller), palingenesis has been used for the exact reproduction of ancestral features by inheritance, as opposed to kenogenesis, in which the inherited characteristics are modified by environment.

It was also applied to the quite different process supposed by Karl Beurlen to be the mechanism for his orthogenetic theory of evolution.

See also
 Palingenetic ultranationalism

Notes

References

 

Reincarnation
Religious philosophical concepts